U.C. Sampdoria returned to Serie A after a four year-absence, and immediately re-established itself as a team on the top half of the domestic championship. Goalkeeper Francesco Antonioli offered crucial experience, but apart from him did the bulk of the squad play in the 2002-03 Serie B, with top goalscorers Fabio Bazzani and Francesco Flachi quickly adjusting themselves to the higher pace of Serie A. Midfielders Sergio Volpi and Angelo Palombo also stood out. Right back Aimo Diana even earned a call-up to the national team following his performances.

Squad

Goalkeepers
  Francesco Antonioli
  Luigi Turci
  Emanuele Bianchi

Defenders
  Stefano Bettarini
  Moris Carrozzieri
  Mirko Conte
  Giulio Falcone
  Aimo Diana
  Nenad Sakić
  Stefano Sacchetti
  Cristian Zenoni

Midfielders
  Sergio Volpi
  Angelo Palombo
  Biagio Pagano
  Bratislav Živković
  Francesco Pedone
  Cristiano Doni
  Massimo Donati
  Luca Antonini
  Fabian Valtolina

Attackers
  Giacomo Cipriani
  Fabio Bazzani
  Francesco Flachi
  Atsushi Yanagisawa
  Antonio Floro Flores
  Thomas Job

Serie A

Matches

 Reggina-Sampdoria 2-2
 1-0 Francesco Cozza (5)
 2-0 David Di Michele (41)
 2-1 Fabio Bazzani (64)
 2-2 Aimo Diana (73)
 Sampdoria-Lazio 1-2
 0-1 Simone Inzaghi (9)
 0-2 Demetrio Albertini (64 pen)
 1-2 Fabio Bazzani (73)
 Inter-Sampdoria 0-0
 Sampdoria-Brescia 2-1
 0-1 Stefano Mauri (69)
 1-1 Fabio Bazzani (88)
 2-1 Francesco Flachi (90 + 1 pen)
 Parma-Sampdoria 1-0
 1-0 Adriano (19)
 Chievo-Sampdoria 1-1
 1-0 Amauri (24)
 1-1 Aimo Diana (59)
 Sampdoria-Milan 0-3
 0-1 Jon Dahl Tomasson (38)
 0-2 Andriy Shevchenko (59)
 0-3 Andriy Shevchenko (90 + 2)
 Bologna-Sampdoria 0-1
 0-1 Cristiano Doni (33)
 Sampdoria-Empoli 2-0
 1-0 Fabio Bazzani (21)
 2-0 Cristiano Doni (27)
 Lecce-Sampdoria 0-0
 Sampdoria-Ancona 2-0
 1-0 Fabio Bazzani (67)
 2-0 Francesco Flachi (89)
 Sampdoria-Siena 2-1
 1-0 Francesco Flachi (1)
 1-1 Roberto D'Aversa (38)
 2-1 Fabio Bazzani (72)
 Perugia-Sampdoria 3-3
 0-1 Francesco Flachi (16)
 1-1 Giovanni Ignoffo (38)
 2-1 Massimo Margiotta (55)
 3-1 Giovanni Tedesco (58)
 3-2 Michele Tardioli (60 og)
 3-3 Francesco Flachi (89)
 Sampdoria-Modena 1-1
 0-1 Diomansy Kamara (22)
 1-1 Fabio Bazzani (50)
 Udinese-Sampdoria 0-1
 0-1 Francesco Flachi (57)
 Sampdoria-Juventus 1-2
 0-1 Mauro Camoranesi (23)
 1-1 Francesco Flachi (56)
 1-2 Antonio Conte (64)
 Roma-Sampdoria 3-1
 0-1 Fabio Bazzani (6)
 1-1 John Carew (10)
 2-1 Francesco Totti (61)
 3-1 Francesco Totti (67)
 Sampdoria-Reggina 2-0
 1-0 Fabio Bazzani (45)
 2-0 Fabio Bazzani (47)
 Lazio-Sampdoria 1-1
 1-0 Stefano Fiore (11)
 1-1 Fabio Bazzani (50)
 Sampdoria-Inter 2-2
 0-1 Christian Vieri (31)
 1-1 Giacomo Cipriani (56)
 1-2 Christian Vieri (79)
 2-2 Cristiano Doni (85 pen)
 Brescia-Sampdoria 1-1
 1-0 Andrea Caracciolo (5)
 1-1 Cristiano Doni (56)
 Sampdoria-Parma 1-2
 0-1 Alberto Gilardino (59)
 0-2 Mark Bresciano (74)
 1-2 Antonio Floro Flores (82)
 Sampdoria-Chievo 1-0
 1-0 Aimo Diana (50)
 Milan-Sampdoria 3-1
 1-0 Andrea Pirlo (17)
 1-1 Cristiano Doni (27)
 2-1 Filippo Inzaghi (35)
 3-1 Kaká (49)
 Sampdoria-Bologna 3-2
 1-0 Sergio Volpi (9 pen)
 1-1 Giuseppe Signori (10)
 2-1 Aimo Diana (28)
 3-1 Giacomo Cipriani (50)
 3-2 Carlo Nervo (69)
 Empoli-Sampdoria 1-1
 0-1 Manuel Belleri (18 og)
 1-1 Tommaso Rocchi (90)
 Sampdoria-Lecce 2-2
 1-0 Francesco Flachi (8)
 1-1 Javier Chevantón (35 pen)
 2-1 Francesco Flachi (42)
 2-2 Axel Cédric Konan (90 + 4)
 Ancona-Sampdoria 0-1
 0-1 Fabio Bazzani (18)
 Siena-Sampdoria 0-0
 Sampdoria-Perugia 3-2
 1-0 Aimo Diana (38)
 2-0 Francesco Flachi (44)
 2-1 Zé Maria (46)
 2-2 Fabrizio Ravanelli (84)
 3-2 Francesco Flachi (87)
 Modena-Sampdoria 1-0
 1-0 Diomansy Kamara (59)
 Sampdoria-Udinese 1-3
 0-1 Marek Jankulovski (28)
 1-1 Fabio Bazzani (51)
 1-2 David Pizarro (58 pen)
 1-3 Vincenzo Iaquinta (87)
 Juventus-Sampdoria 2-0
 1-0 Nicola Legrottaglie (37)
 2-0 Stephen Appiah (44)
 Sampdoria-Roma 0-0

Topscorers
  Fabio Bazzani 13
  Francesco Flachi 11
  Cristiano Doni 6
  Aimo Diana 5

Sources
  RSSSF - Italy 2003/04

U.C. Sampdoria seasons
Sampdoria